James Richard Hendrix  (August 20, 1925 – November 14, 2002) was a United States Army master sergeant and a recipient of the United States military's highest decoration for valor—the Medal of Honor—for his actions in Belgium during World War II.

Biography
Hendrix was born and raised in Lepanto, Arkansas, the oldest child of a sharecropper with fourteen children. He left elementary school at West Side after the third grade to work in the fields in order to help his family at home. He learned marksmanship skills while hunting for food. In 1943, at age 18, he was drafted into the U.S. Army. He was sent to basic training in Florida, the first time he had been more than a few miles from his hometown. He became a member of the 4th Armored Division after basic training.

He was sent to Europe as a private with Company C, 53rd Armored Infantry Battalion, 4th Armored Division. After waiting out the invasion of Normandy aboard ship in the English Channel, the 4th AD landed on Utah Beach on June 11, 1944, and joined the drive across France and into Belgium as the spearhead of General George Patton's Third Army.

During the Battle of the Bulge, on December 26, 1944, near , Belgium, Hendrix, a bazooka man, captured two enemy artillery guncrews, and armed with a rifle, held off the fire of two machine guns until wounded comrades could be evacuated, and then rescued a soldier from a burning vehicle. He was presented the Medal of Honor by President Truman at a White House ceremony on August 23, 1945; he was awarded the medal on September 1, 1945.

Hendrix re-enlisted in 1945, and became a paratrooper; during parachute training he broke his leg when his chute failed to open. He reached the rank of master sergeant and served in combat with a parachute unit during the Korean War and served briefly during the Vietnam War before retiring from the Army in 1966. He died of cancer at age 77 and was buried in the Florida National Cemetery, Bushnell, Florida.

Medal of Honor citation
Hendrix's official Medal of Honor citation reads:

On the night of 26 December 1944, near Assenois, Belgium, he was with the leading element engaged in the final thrust to break through to the besieged garrison at Bastogne when halted by a fierce combination of artillery and small arms fire. He dismounted from his half-track and advanced against two 88mm. guns, and, by the ferocity of his rifle fire, compelled the guncrews to take cover and then to surrender. Later in the attack he again left his vehicle, voluntarily, to aid 2 wounded soldiers, helpless and exposed to intense machinegun fire. Effectively silencing 2 hostile machineguns, he held off the enemy by his own fire until the wounded men were evacuated. Pvt. Hendrix again distinguished himself when he hastened to the aid of still another soldier who was trapped in a burning half-track. Braving enemy sniper fire and exploding mines and ammunition in the vehicle, he extricated the wounded man and extinguished his flaming clothing, thereby saving the life of his fellow soldier. Pvt. Hendrix, by his superb courage and heroism, exemplified the highest traditions of the military service.

See also

List of Medal of Honor recipients for World War II
James H. Fields
Joseph J. Sadowski

References

1925 births
2002 deaths
People from Lepanto, Arkansas
United States Army soldiers
United States Army personnel of World War II
United States Army Medal of Honor recipients
World War II recipients of the Medal of Honor
Burials at Florida National Cemetery